Maude Amber McAfee-Maggart (born February 24, 1975) is an American cabaret singer and recording artist who performs throughout the United States and Europe, but most often in Los Angeles, San Francisco, and New York City.

Biography
Maggart was born in New York City to Broadway veterans Brandon Maggart and Diane McAfee and is the sister of singer/songwriter Fiona Apple. Growing up going by the name Amber, she changed her stage name at the age of 20 to Maude, after her paternal great-grandmother, Maude Apple.

Maggart's brother, Garett Maggart, starred in the TV series The Sentinel. In addition, her maternal grandparents were Millicent Greene, a dancer with the George White's Scandals, a series of 1920s musical revues similar to the Ziegfeld Follies, and Johnny McAfee, a multireedist and vocalist of the big band era. Her grandparents met while touring with Johnny Hamp and his Orchestra. She went to the Fiorello H. LaGuardia High School of Music & Art and Performing Arts, in New York City. Her 2001 cabaret debut in Los Angeles prompted critic Les Traub to write that she is "destined to become a major cabaret star."

She has been described as a "strikingly beautiful and poised performer," and has been widely praised for her vocal talent, her intelligent, emotional, witty interpretations, as well as for her taste in song selection primarily from the American popular song book featuring the works of Irving Berlin, George Gershwin, Jerome Kern, Harold Arlen, Johnny Mercer, Vernon Duke, and Rodgers and Hart. She has paid vocal tribute in her concerts to such popular singers and predecessors as Helen Morgan, Annette Hanshaw, Ruth Etting, Alice Faye, Helen Forrest and lyricist Marshall Barer. Her 2006 concerts have featured established standards as well as exquisite renditions of songs by Jackson Browne and Joan Baez.

Her first album Look For the Silver Lining focuses on songs of the 1920s. The selections on her second album, With Sweet Despair, range in era and style. Her third album features a repertoire of standards and is titled Maude Maggart Sings Irving Berlin, which included "When I Lost You," Maggart's rendition of which is featured in the movie Spike. In 2007 she released Maude Maggart Live. Her latest recording is a collaboration with Brent Spiner, entitled Dreamland.

Embraced as a protégée and colleague of such other performers as Michael Feinstein and Andrea Marcovicci, she has been profiled on National Public Radio, in the New York Times and Time Out New York and has appeared on such shows as Prairie Home Companion. In 2005, she received the Backstage Ira Eaker Award, The Tony Award for Outstanding Achievement in Cabaret and the Manhattan Association of Cabarets and Clubs (M.A.C.) award for Best Female Debut. She has performed regularly at the Oak Room of the Algonquin Hotel in New York, the Gardenia in Hollywood and the Plush Room in San Francisco.

Discography

Albums
Maude Maggart Sings 1920's Broadway (2002)
Look for the Silver Lining (2003)
With Sweet Despair (2005)
Maude Maggart Sings Irving Berlin (2005)
Maude Maggart Live (2007)
Dreamland (2008) with Brent Spiner
Here Come The Dreamers (2017) limited edition release - only 100 copies (CDs) pressed

Cabaret shows
Each Maude Maggart show has a theme running through the show. The songs are put together to tell a story from the beginning of the evening to the end.

 Shaking the Blues Away: A 1920s Cabaret (2003/4)
 Irving Berlin: The Songs of Irving Berlin (2006/7)
 Good Girl Bad Girl, explores the emotional complexities of songs written for both naughty and nice, and others open to interpretation (2007/8).
 Speaking of Dreams, love and dreams are connected in song (2008/9).
 Parents and Children (2009/10)
 Three Little Words, songs with three-word titles (2010).
 Everybody's Doin' It (2011)
 Into the Garden, inspired by the recent centenary of the Titanic (2012).
 The Door Opened with John Boswell on piano (2014)
 Music That Lasts: Maude Maggart and the American Songbook, as part of the Chicago Humanities Festival, view the entire concert (May 4, 2019).

Other notable appearances
 "Pale September", backing vocals on Fiona Apple's 1996 album Tidal
 "The Very Thought of You / When I Fall on Love", a duet with Tim Draxl on his 2001 album Insongniac
 "Moonlight", "I'm Outta Here" and "Please, Don't Let It Be Love" with Ray Jessel on his 2003 album The First Seventy Years
 "The Bends" (backing vocals) with Christine Lavin on her 2005 album Folkzinger
 "Baby", a duet with John Lithgow on his 2006 album The Sunny Side of the Street
 "My Ship", "The River Is So Blue", "Buddy on the Nightshift" with Andrea Marcovicci & vocal ensemble on her 2007 album Kurt Weill in America
 Johnny Mercer: The Dream's on Me, Television special, 2009 (Turner). On the associated album 'Clint Eastwood Presents: Johnny Mercer "The Dream's On Me" - A Celebration of His Music', Maude sings "Skylark" with Jamie Cullum 
 "Finding Words for Spring" with Ray Jessel on his 2009 album Naughty or Nice
 "Find Your Song", "Not the Star You Thought I'd Be" with David Lucky on his 2011 album Kill 'em with Kindness
 A Prairie Home Companion (NPR)
 Fiona Apple's The Idler Wheel... on the track "Hot Knife" (2012)
 "Hushabye Mountain", "Sing for Your Supper", "Save Your Sorrow / Look for the Silver Lining", "Ready for the River", "Was That the Human Thing to Do?" as guest vocalist on the Molly Ryan album Swing for Your Supper (2013)
 "I'm in the Middle of a Riddle" with Fiona Apple on the Starbucks-sponsored album Sweetheart 2014 (2014)
 "Finale/Good Night Irene" with Christine Lavin and Friends on the album Live at McCabe's (2015)
 "The Poor People of Paris" with Howard Alden on the 2016 album Trip the Light Fantastic by Swami Júnior, Manu Lafer & Howard Alden
 Guest vocals on all but one track on the 2017 album The Word by Manu Lafer
 "Newspaper" (as Maude Maggart) and "Ladies" (as Amber Maggart - her real name) from Fiona Apple's 2020 album "Fetch the Bolt Cutters", credited as background vocals
 "While There Is Still Time" - honouring frontline medical workers during the COVID-19 pandemic (music by Michele Brourman, lyrics by Hillary Rollins) (April 2020)

References

External links
 
 NPR interview with Maggart

1975 births
Living people
Bennington College alumni
Singers from New York City
Torch singers
21st-century American singers
21st-century American women singers